The Rural Municipality of North Battleford No. 437 is a rural municipality (RM) in the Canadian province of Saskatchewan within Census Division No. 16 and  Division No. 6. Located in the west-central portion of the province, it comprises the rural area generally to the north and east of the City of North Battleford.

History 
The RM of North Battleford No. 437 incorporated as a rural municipality on December 12, 1910.

Geography

Communities and localities 
The following unincorporated communities are within the RM.

Localities
 Brada

Demographics 

Government 
The RM of North Battleford No. 437 is governed by an elected municipal council and an appointed administrator that meets on the second Wednesday of every month. The reeve of the RM is Dan Bartko while its administrator is Debbie Arsenault. The RM's office is located in North Battleford.

Infrastructure 
The North Battleford Energy Centre, a 260  generating station, was built by Northland Power in the RM.

References 

 
N
Division No. 16, Saskatchewan